Real World/Road Rules Extreme Challenge is the fourth season of the MTV reality game show, The Challenge (at the time known as Real World/Road Rules Challenge). 
The season is directly subsequent to Real World/Road Rules Challenge 2000. 

Extreme Challenge is the first season that adorned the show with a subtitle, the series having begun a new trend of titling each season based on its format and theme. To date, it's also the only season in which the season title alters the show title, through the insertion of "Extreme" between "Real World/Road Rules" and "Challenge".

Extreme Challenge consisted of the third and final six-on-six Challenge. The cast was split up into two different six-person teams, one representing The Real World and the other representing Road Rules. The teams traveled via tour bus in the eastern U.S. and Europe competing in different challenges. Each time a team won an individual challenge, money would be added to a Monster.com team bank account. The last mission would be for the right to keep the money collected in the pot, an additional cash prize, and a car.

Cast

This was the only season without a regular alumni host/presenter introducing each challenge. Instead, various alumni provided audio clues.

Game summary

 Real World
 Road Rules

 Yellow Team
 Black Team

Final results
Real World won the final challenge, winning brand new Toyota Celicas. They earned $110,000 with each team member receiving $18,833. For winning the "Human Foosball" mini-challenge, Dan, Julie, and Rebecca received an additional $1,000 for a total of $19,833.
Road Rules lost the final challenge, therefore losing their entire bank. For winning the "Human Foosball" mini-challenge, Christian, Emily, and James received an additional $1,000.

Teams

Memorable moments
 The episode entitled "Couple Fashion Show" featured both teams having to dress up as famous duos in a fetish club. This episode has never been aired following its original air date, for reasons that remain unknown.

Episodes

Reunion special
The reunion special, Real World/Road Rules Extreme Challenge: Cease Fire, aired after the season finale and was attended by the entire cast. It was hosted by Melissa Howard from The Real World: New Orleans and Mark Long from Road Rules: USA – The First Adventure.

Notes

References

External links 
Cast information and show data at the Internet Movie Database
MTV's official Road Rules website
MTV's official Real World website

Extreme Challenge
2001 American television seasons